Merise is a general-purpose modeling methodology in the field of information systems development, software engineering and project management. First introduced in the early 1980s, it was widely used in France, and was developed and refined to the point where most large French governmental, commercial and industrial organizations had adopted it as their standard methodology. 

Merise proceeds to separate treatment of data and processes, where the data-oriented view is modelled in three stages, from conceptual, logical through to physical. Similarly, the process-oriented view passes through the three stages of conceptual, organizational and operational. These stages in the modelling process are paralleled by the stages of the life cycle: strategic planning, preliminary study, detailed study, development, implementation and maintenance. It is a method of analysis based on the entity-relationship model. By using Merise, you can design tables with relations to make a relational database.

References
 D. Avison, "MERISE: A European Methodology for Developing Information Systems", European Journal of Information Systems, Jan. 1991, p. 183‑191
 Quang, P.T., Chartier-Kastler, C. (1991), Merise in Practice, translated by D. E. and M. A. Avison Macmillan, Basingstoke, .
 René Coletti, Arnold Rochfeld, Hubert Tardieu, La methode MERISE: Principes et outils (Paperback - 1983)
 Frédéric LE, Yves Tabourier, Hubert Tardieu, Actes de la 3ème conférence «Comparative Review of Information System design methodologies - International federation for Information Processing» (CRIS-IFIP, Working Group 8.1), Amsterdam (Hollande), 1986
 Cha Ni Wong, La Fortuna: Prinsipyo ug Teorya
 Jeralgene S. Macabinta: Study of Information Systems, 2008

See also
 SSADM
 UML
 Entity-relationship model

Software development process